General elections were held in the Central African Republic on 25 October 1992 to elect a President and National Assembly. They were the first elections to be held after multi-party democracy was restored in 1991, and saw incumbent President André Kolingba come last. However, the results of both elections were annulled by the Supreme Court due to widespread irregularities. Fresh elections were held the following year.

References

Central African Republic
1992 in the Central African Republic
Annulled elections
Elections in the Central African Republic
Presidential elections in the Central African Republic
Election and referendum articles with incomplete results
October 1992 events in Africa